Taigen Dan Leighton (born 1950, grew up in Pittsburgh, PA) is a Sōtō priest and teacher, academic, and author. He is an authorized lineage holder and Zen teacher in the tradition of Shunryū Suzuki and is the founder and Guiding Teacher of Ancient Dragon Zen Gate in Chicago, Illinois. Leighton is also an authorized teacher in the Japanese Sōtō School (kyōshi).

Biography
Leighton's father was a medical school professor and cancer researcher, his mother a high school French teacher and librarian. Leighton began his Zen practice in 1975 at the New York Zen Center, training under Kando Nakajima rōshi. He studied at Columbia University, where he obtained a bachelor's degree in East Asian studies. Leighton worked as a television and film editor in New York City, and then San Francisco.

In 1978, he moved to California and eventually became a resident at San Francisco Zen Center, where he worked at Tassajara Bakery and other of Zen Center's businesses. In subsequent years, Leighton practiced in residence at all of the San Francisco Zen Center facilities, including Green Gulch Farm Zen Center and Tassajara Zen Mountain Center. In 1986, Leighton was ordained as a priest by Reb Anderson in the latter's first ordination ceremony. In 1990 Leighton served as shuso (head monk) for the Spring practice period at Tassajara monastery under Zenkei Blanche Hartman as her first shuso.

Leighton lived in Japan from 1990–1992, translating Dōgen texts with Shōhaku Okumura and training under various masters. In 1994, Leighton founded the Mountain Source Sangha in Bolinas, San Rafael, and San Francisco, California (of which Ancient Dragon Zen Gate is a sister temple).

In 2000, Leighton received shihō, or Dharma transmission, from Reb Anderson.

He taught for four years at Loyola University Chicago and has taught since 1994 at the Institute of Buddhist Studies, part of the Berkeley Graduate Theological Union, from which Leighton has a Ph.D. degree.

Leighton has been involved in many interfaith dialogue programs, including conducting Buddhist–Christian dialogue workshops. He has long been active in various Engaged Buddhist programs for social justice, including Environmental and Peace activism. Leighton's peace activism goes back to dedicated anti-Vietnam War work in high school, and he was then as a College freshman arrested as part of the 1968 week-long building occupation at Columbia University protesting the War and racism.

In 2007 Leighton relocated to Chicago to serve full-time as Guiding Dharma Teacher for Ancient Dragon Zen Gate, which he had founded with students there a few years before. In 2008 Leighton performed Zuisse ceremonies at Eiheiji and Sōjiji temples in Japan to be recognized as a Dharma teacher by the Japanese Sōtō School. In 2019 Leighton completed Dharma transmission ceremonies at Ancient Dragon Zen Gate for his Dharma heirs Nyozan Eric Shutt and Eishin Nancy Easton.

Professorships
Over the years, Leighton has taught at various universities around the world. The following is a complete list:
Kansai University
Ōtani University
California Institute of Integral Studies
University of San Francisco
Saint Mary's College of California
Institute of Buddhist Studies
Loyola University Chicago
Meadville Lombard Theological School

Gallery

Bibliography
Leighton, Taigen Dan (2022)  “Dōgen’s Vision of the Environment and his Practice of Devotion and Faith,” in Prebish, Charles S. and Ng, On-cho (eds.) The Theory and Practice of Zen Buddhism: A Festschrift in Honor of Steven Heine. Singapore, Springer. pp. 103-121. ISBN 978-981-16-8285-8.  
Leighton, Taigen Dan (2020) "Bob Dylan's Ongoing Critique of Social Injustice and Masters of War" https://www.ancientdragon.org/bob-dylans-ongoing-critique-of-social-injustice-and-masters-of-war/.
Leighton, Taigen Dan (2020)  “Being Time and Deep Time” in Kaza, Stephanie (ed.) A Wild Love for the World: Joanna Macy and the Work of Our Time. Boston: Shambhala. pp. 226-235. ISBN 978-1-61180-795-0.

See also
Buddhism in the United States
Timeline of Zen Buddhism in the United States

References

External links

Buddhist translators
San Francisco Zen Center
Soto Zen Buddhists
Zen Buddhist priests
American Zen Buddhists
Nautilus Book Award winners
Living people
1950 births
Columbia College (New York) alumni
Graduate Theological Union alumni